Rusike is a Zimbabwean surname. Notable people with the surname include:

Evans Rusike (born 1990), Zimbabwean football forward 
Matthew Rusike (born 1990), Zimbabwean football player
Tafadzwa Rusike (born 1989), Zimbabwean football winger

Surnames of African origin